Carabus uenoianus, is a species of ground beetle in the large genus Carabus.

References 

uenoianus
Insects described in 1995